The Sulaiman Range gecko (Cyrtopodion kohsulaimanai ) is a species of gecko, a lizard in the family Gekkonidae. The species is endemic to northwestern Pakistan.

Geographic range
C. kohsulaimanai is found in Punjab Province, Pakistan.

References

Further reading
Khan MS (1991). "A new Tenuidactylus gecko from the Sulaiman Range, Punjab, Pakistan". Journal of Herpetology 25 (2): 199–204. (Tenuidactylus kohsulaimani, new species).

Cyrtopodion
Reptiles described in 1991